Nav Raj Dhami is a Nepalese politician, belonging to the Communist Party of Nepal (Maoist). In the 2008 Constituent Assembly election, he was elected from the Mugu-1 constituency, winning 10,100 votes.

References

Living people
Year of birth missing (living people)
Communist Party of Nepal (Maoist Centre) politicians
Nepalese atheists

Members of the 1st Nepalese Constituent Assembly